The Roman Catholic Diocese of (Santíssima) Conceição do Araguaia is a Latin suffragan diocese of the Roman Catholic church, in the Ecclesiastical province of the Metropolitan of Belém do Pará in Brazil.

Its cathedral see is Catedral Nossa Senhora da Conceição ('Our Lady of (Immaculate) Conception'), in the city of Conceição do Araguaia.

History 
 Established on July 18, 1911 as Territorial Prelature of (Santíssima) Conceição do Araguaia, on territory split off from the Roman Catholic Archdiocese of Belém do Pará (then and again its Metropolitan)
 Lost territory twice : to establish the Territorial Prelature of Xingu on 16 August 1934 and again to establish the Territorial Prelature of São Félix on 13 May 1969
 December 20, 1969: Suppressed, losing its territory to the Territorial Prelature of Marabá
 March 27, 1976: Restored as Territorial Prelature of Santíssima Conceição do Araguaia from the Territorial Prelature of Cristalândia and Territorial Prelature of Marabá
 October 16, 1979: Promoted as Diocese of Santíssima Conceição do Araguaia

Ordinaries 

(all Roman rite; mostly missionary members of Latin congregations)
 Territorial (Bishop-)Prelates of Santíssima Conceição do Araguaia 
 Bishop-prelate Raymond Dominique Carrerot, Dominicans (O.P.), Titular Bishop of Verinopolis (1912.08.26 – 1920.07.30); later Bishop of Porto Nacional (Brazil) (1920.07.30 – 1933.12.14)
 Sebastião Tomás, O.P., first as apostolic administrator (1920 – 1924.12.18),  
 then as Bishop-Prelate (1924.12.18 – 1945.12.19), Titular Bishop of Platæa (1924.12.18 – 1945.12.19)
 Bishop Estêvão Cardoso de Avellar, O.P. (1976.03.27 – 1978.03.20)
 Bishop Luís António Palha Teixeira, O.P., first as Apostolic Administrator (1948.01.02 – 1951.02.20)
 then as Bishop-prelate (1951.02.20 – 1969.12.20), Titular Bishop of Lunda (1951.02.20 – 1981.08.21); later Bishop-Prelate of the then Marabá (Brazil) (1969.12.20 – 1976.11.10)
 prelature suppressed 1969-1976
 Bishop-prelate Patrício José Hanrahan, Redemptorists (C.Ss.R.) (1979.01.29 – 1979.10.16 see below)

 Diocesan Bishops of Santíssima Conceição do Araguaia 
 Patrício José Hanrahan, C.Ss.R. ( see above 1979.10.16 – 1993.05.25)
 Pedro José Conti (1995.12.27 – 2004.12.29), later Bishop of Macapá (Brazil) (2004.12.29 – ...)
 Dominique Marie Jean Denis You (2006.02.08 – present)

Source and external links 
 GCatholic.org, with incumbent biography links
 Catholic Hierarchy

Roman Catholic dioceses in Brazil
Christian organizations established in 1911
Santissima Conceicao do Araguaia, Roman Catholic Diocese of
Roman Catholic dioceses and prelatures established in the 20th century